In mathematics, Montgomery's pair correlation conjecture is a conjecture made by  that the pair correlation between pairs of zeros of the Riemann zeta function (normalized to have unit average spacing) is

which, as Freeman Dyson pointed out to him, is the same as the pair correlation function of random Hermitian matrices.

Conjecture 
Under the assumption that the Riemann Hypothesis is true.

Let  be fixed, as  

Also  denotes the delta measure supported at 0.

 Explanation 

Informally, this means that the chance of finding a zero in a very short interval of length 2πL/log(T) at a distance 2πu/log(T) from a zero 1/2+iT is about L times the expression above. (The factor 2π/log(T) is a normalization factor that can be thought of informally as the average spacing between zeros with imaginary part about T.)  showed that the conjecture was supported by large-scale computer calculations of the zeros. The conjecture has been extended to correlations of more than two zeros, and also to zeta functions of automorphic representations . In 1982 a student of Montgomery's, Ali Erhan Özlük, proved the pair correlation conjecture for some of Dirichlet's L-functions.

The connection with random unitary matrices could lead to a proof of the Riemann hypothesis (RH). The Hilbert–Pólya conjecture asserts that the zeros of the Riemann Zeta function correspond to the eigenvalues of a linear operator, and implies RH. Some people think this is a promising approach.

Montgomery was studying the Fourier transform F(x) of the pair correlation function, and showed (assuming the Riemann hypothesis) that it was
equal to |x| for |x| < 1. His methods were unable to determine it for |x| ≥ 1, but he conjectured that it was equal to 1 for these x, which implies that the pair correlation function is as above. He was also motivated by the notion that the Riemann hypothesis is not a brick wall, and one should feel free to make stronger conjectures.

 F(α) conjecture or strong pair correlation conjecture 
Let again  and  stand for non-trivial zeros of the Riemann zeta function. Montgomery introduced the function

Montgomery and Goldstone proved under the Riemann hypothesis, that for  this function converges uniformly

Montgomery conjectured, which is now known as the F(α) conjecture or strong pair correlation conjecture, that for  we have uniform convergence

 Numerical calculation by Odlyzko 

In the 1980s, motivated by the Montgomery's conjecture, Odlyzko began an intensive numerical study of the statistics of the zeros of ζ(s).  He confirmed that the distribution of the spacings between non-trivial zeros using detail numerical calculation and demonstrated that the Montgomery's conjecture would be true and the distribution would agree with the distribution of spacings of GUE random matrix eigenvalues using Cray X-MP. In 1987 he reported the calculations in the paper .

For non-trivial zero, 1/2 + iγn, let the normalized spacings be

Then we would expect the following formula as the limit for :

Based on a new algorithm developed by Odlyzko and Schönhage that allowed them to compute a value of ζ(1/2 + it) in an average time of t''ε steps, Odlyzko computed millions of zeros at heights around 1020 and gave some evidence for the GUE conjecture.

The figure contains the first 105 non-trivial zeros of the Riemann zeta function. As more zeros are sampled, the more closely their distribution approximates the shape of the GUE random matrix.

See also
Lehmer pair

References

Zeta and L-functions
Conjectures
Unsolved problems in number theory
Analytic number theory
Random matrices